Guy Antony Jameson, FRS, FREng (born 20 November 1934, Gillingham, Kent) is Professor in the Department of Aerospace Engineering at Texas A&M University. Jameson is known for his pioneering work in the field of computational fluid dynamics. He has published more than 300 scientific papers (authored or co-authored) in a wide range of areas including computational fluid dynamics, aerodynamics, and control theory.

Jameson was elected a member of the National Academy of Engineering in 1997 for contributions to aircraft through the development of computational fluid dynamics. He was awarded the 2005 Elmer A. Sperry Award and received the 2015 AIAA/ASME/SAE/AHS Daniel Guggenheim Medal for lifetime achievement. He is an Honorary Fellow of the AIAA.

Early life
Born in Gillingham, Kent, UK Jameson spent much of his early childhood in India where his father was stationed as a British Army Officer. He first attended school at St. Edward's School, Shimla. Subsequently, he was educated in England at Mowden Hall School and Winchester College.

Jameson served as a lieutenant in the British Army in 1953–1955, and was sent to Malaya. On coming out of the army he worked in the compressor design section of Bristol Aero-Engines in the summer of 1955, before studying engineering at Trinity Hall, Cambridge.  Jameson graduated with first class honours in 1958. Subsequently, he stayed on at Cambridge to obtain a PhD in Magnetohydrodynamics, and he was a Research Fellow of Trinity Hall from 1960 to 1963.

Career in the UK
On leaving Cambridge he worked as an economist for the Trades Union Congress in 1964–1965. He then became Chief Mathematician at Hawker Siddeley in Coventry.

Career in the United States
In 1966, Jameson joined the Aerodynamics Section of Grumman Aircraft Engineering Corporation in Bethpage, New York. In this period, his work was largely directed toward the application of automatic control theory to stability augmentation systems. Starting in 1970, he began to concentrate on the problem of predicting transonic flow. Existing numerical methods were not equal to the task, and it was clear that new methods would have to be developed. At that time limitations in computer capabilities also precluded any attempt to calculate the flow past a complete aircraft, but useful efforts could be made for simpler configurations such as airfoils and wings.

In 1972 Jameson moved to the Courant Institute of Mathematical Sciences at New York University, where he continued his work on transonic flow. In 1974 he was appointed Professor of Computer Science at New York University. He joined Princeton University in 1980, and in 1982 he was appointed James Smith McDonnell Distinguished University Professor of Aerospace Engineering. He was Director of the University's Program in Applied and Computational Mathematics from 1986 to 1988.  He was a Professor of Engineering in the Department of Aeronautics and Astronautics from 1997–2015, Stanford University. He is currently Jack E. & Frances Brown I Chair in Engineering in the Department of Aerospace Engineering at Texas A&M University.

Computational fluid dynamics methods
During his career, Professor Jameson has devised a variety of new schemes for solving the Euler and Navier-Stokes equations for inviscid and viscous compressible flows.  For example, he devised a multigrid-scheme for the solution of steady flow problems and the dual time stepping scheme for unsteady flows.

Jameson also wrote the FLO and SYN series of computer programs which have been widely used in the aircraft industry.

Awards
In 1980 he received the NASA Medal for Exceptional Scientific Achievement in recognition of his earlier work on transonic potential flow. In 1988 he received the Gold Medal of the British Royal Aeronautical Society for his outstanding contribution to the development of methods for the calculation of transonic flow over real aircraft configurations. In 1991 he was elected a Fellow of the American Institute of Aeronautics and Astronautics, and he was also elected an Honorary Fellow of Trinity Hall, Cambridge. In 1993, he was selected to receive the American Institute of Aeronautics and Astronautics Fluid Dynamics Award in recognition of numerous contributions to computational fluid dynamics and the development of many widely used computer programs which have immeasurably improved the capability to analyse and understand complex flows. In 1995 he was elected a Fellow of the Royal Society of London for Improving Natural Knowledge. In 1995, he was selected by ASME to receive The Spirit of St. Louis Medal for numerous outstanding contributions to computational fluid dynamics and the development of many widely used computer programs that have immeasurably improved understanding of complex flow fields and become a dominant tool for aerodynamic design. In 1996 he was selected to receive the Theodorsen Lectureship Award from ICASE/NASA, Langley. In 1997 he was elected as a Foreign Associate to the National Academy of Engineering. In 2001 he received the degree Docteur Honoris Causa from the University of Paris, and in 2002 he received the degree Docteur Honoris Causa from Uppsala University. In 2006 he received the Elmer A. Sperry Award. In 2005, he was elected as a Fellow of the Royal Academy of Engineering.
In 2015, he won one of the highest honours presented for a lifetime of achievement in aeronautics: the Daniel Guggenheim Medal.

References

1934 births
Living people
British aerospace engineers
Fluid dynamicists
People educated at Winchester College
Alumni of Trinity Hall, Cambridge
Computational fluid dynamicists
Stanford University School of Engineering faculty
Princeton University faculty
Courant Institute of Mathematical Sciences faculty
Fellows of the American Institute of Aeronautics and Astronautics
Fellows of the Royal Society
Royal Engineers officers
British Army personnel of the Malayan Emergency